The first series of Dancing on Ice aired from 14 January to 4 March 2006 on ITV. It was presented by Phillip Schofield and Holly Willoughby, and judged by the "Ice Panel", consisting of Nicky Slater, Karen Kresge, Jason Gardiner, Karen Barber and Robin Cousins. Jayne Torvill and Christopher Dean coached and trained the contestants.

Judges and presenters
The judging panel was announced as Nicky Slater, Karen Kresge, Jason Gardiner, Karen Barber and Robin Cousins. Cousins was announced as head judge while Holly Willoughby and Phillip Schofield were announced as hosts with Jayne Torvill and Christopher Dean as coaches. Kresge left after this series.

Couples
The 10 celebrities and professional ice skaters were:

Scoring chart

Red numbers indicate the lowest score of the week
Green numbers indicate the highest score of the week
 indicates that the couple were in the skate off but was not eliminated
 indicates that the couple were eliminated
 indicates that the couple won
 indicates that the couple came in second place
 indicates that the couple came in third place

Average chart
This table only counts for dances scored on a traditional 30-point scale.

Live show details

Week 1 (14 January)

Judges' votes to save
 Slater: Gaynor and Daniel
 Kresge: Gaynor and Daniel
 Gardiner: Gaynor and Daniel
 Barber: Gaynor and Daniel 
 Cousins: Gaynor and Daniel

Week 2 (21 January)

Judges' votes to save
 Slater: Stefan & Kristina
 Kresge: Stefan & Kristina
 Gardiner: Andi & Tamara
 Barber: Andi & Tamara
 Cousins: Stefan & Kristina

Week 3 (28 January)

Judges' votes to save
 Slater: Stefan & Kristina
 Kresge: Stefan & Kristina
 Gardiner: Andrea & Doug
 Barber: Stefan & Kristina
 Cousins: Stefan & Kristina

Week 4 (4 February)
 Theme: Las Vegas Night

Judges' votes to save
 Slater: Stefan & Kristina
 Kresge: Stefan & Kristina
 Gardiner: John & Olga
 Barber: John & Olga
 Cousins: Stefan & Kristina

Week 5 (11 February)

Judges' votes to save
 Slater: Sean & Marika
 Kresge: Kelly & Todd
 Gardiner: Kelly & Todd
 Barber: Kelly & Todd
 Cousins: Kelly & Todd

Week 6 (18 February)

Judges' votes to save
 Slater: Bonnie & Matt
 Kresge: Bonnie & Matt
 Gardiner: Bonnie & Matt
 Barber: Bonnie & Matt
 Cousins: Bonnie & Matt

Week 7 (25 February)

Judges' votes to save
 Slater: Bonnie & Matt
 Kresge: Bonnie & Matt
 Gardiner: Bonnie & Matt
 Barber: Bonnie & Matt
 Cousins: Bonnie & Matt

Week 8 (4 March)

Ratings

References

Series 01
2006 British television seasons